Maryland Route 513 (MD 513) is a state highway in the U.S. state of Maryland.  Known for much of its length as Cedar Lane, the state highway runs  from Jackson Road just south of the interchange with U.S. Route 13 (US 13) north to US 13 Business, almost entirely within Fruitland.  MD 513 was constructed as a county highway around 1980 following the completion of the highway's interchange with the Salisbury Bypass and became a state highway in 1982.

Route description

MD 513 begins at an intersection with Jackson Road just south of its diamond interchange with US 13 (Salisbury Bypass).  St. Lukes Road continues south as a county highway toward MD 12.  MD 513 heads north a two-lane undivided road, entering the city of Fruitland at the intersection where St. Lukes Road splits to the northwest.  The state highway continues north as Cedar Lane and meets Division Street at a roundabout.  After crossing the Delmarva Central Railroad's Delmarva Subdivision track at-grade, the state highway meets its northern terminus at US 13 Business (Fruitland Boulevard).  Cedar Lane continues north through Fruitland toward Camden Avenue, the original alignment of US 13.

History
Cedar Lane was extended south to St. Lukes Road on the edge of Fruitland in 1979 to provide a more direct connection from US 13 to St. Lukes Road's interchange with the Salisbury Bypass, which was completed in 1981.  MD 513 was assigned along its present route in 1982. The roundabout at the junction with Division Street was installed in 2007.

Junction list

See also

References

External links

MDRoads: MD 513

513
Maryland Route 513
Fruitland, Maryland